Mahmud Kandi may refer to:
 Mahmud Kandi, Maku
 Mahmud Kandi, Showt